Pristimantis galdi is a species of frog in the family Strabomantidae. Its common name is Espada's robber frog. It is found in Ecuador and Peru.
Its natural habitats are evergreen secondary and old growth humid montane forest .
It is threatened by habitat loss.

References

galdi
Amphibians of Ecuador
Amphibians of Peru
Taxa named by Marcos Jiménez de la Espada
Amphibians described in 1870
Taxonomy articles created by Polbot